Daphne's Greek Cafe or, Daphne's California Greek is an American fast-casual Greek restaurant operating in California. The restaurant name refers to Daphne of Greek mythology whom the god Apollo desired.

Daphne's was rated #11 in 2006 Top 100 Movers and Shakers in the Fast Casual magazine.  Daphne's was voted Best Greek in the June 2008 issue of San Diego Magazine.

History 
Daphne's Greek Cafe was founded by George Katakalidis in 1991. The chain entered bankruptcy in January 2010. It currently has 60 locations throughout Arizona and California and was recently purchased out of bankruptcy by an investor group headed by William Trefethen. In 2011, Daphne's name changed to Daphne's California Greek with a new concept that has been characterized as:  a “hybrid” of California-meets-Greek cuisine, with an emphasis on freshness.

Daphne's California Greek continued their re-branding effort under William Trefethen group for about 4 years before suddenly selling the company to a Chicago investment group named Victory Park Capital.

See also
 List of Greek restaurants

Notes

External links 
Daphne's California Greek

Restaurants in San Diego County, California
Food and drink companies based in Los Angeles
Greek restaurants in the United States
Fast casual restaurants
Privately held companies based in California
Restaurants established in 1991
Companies that filed for Chapter 11 bankruptcy in 2010
1991 establishments in California